Pierre Humbourg (22 December 1901 – 21 August 1969) was a 20th-century French journalist and writer.

Biography 
Pierre Humbourg is the son of Paul Adrien Humbourg, infantry captain. He spent his childhood in the village of Gandelu in the Aisne department with his brother André and his sister Régine. His grandfather introduced him to painting. His father died at the beginning of the war in 1914 at the age of 49; Pierre was sent to the Prytanée national militaire at La Flèche. At the age of 18, he entered the hydrographic school at Marseilles. He settled in this city two years later.

Selected bibliography 
1927: Escale, Nouvelle Revue Française, Prix Rencontre
1929: Feux éteints
1929: L’Homme qui n’a jamais vu le Printemps
1929: Silvestre le Simple
1930: Aux Mains des Innocents
1931: Tempête
1932: Impasse 
1947: Le miroir sans tain, Éditions Gallimard, Prix Cazes 1948
1950: Le bar de minuit passé
1951: L’Histoire des Autres
1955: Les Sentiers de l'automne
1958: Le Prince Consort, Gallimard
1959: Les Sentiers de l’Automne, Gallimard
1959: Lord Byron et les femmes, Gallimard
1960: Par une nuit sans Lune

References

External links 
 Perdus Trouvés : anthologie de littérature oubliée on Le Matricule des Anges 
 Pierre Humbourg
 Pierre Humbourg on Éditions Gallimard
 Fonds Pierre Humbourg on Calames

20th-century French journalists
20th-century French writers
People from Vosges (department)
1901 births
1969 deaths